Joan Heckaman (born May 30, 1946) is a former North Dakota Democratic-NPL Party member of the North Dakota Senate, representing the 23rd district. She served as Senate Minority Leader between 2016-2022.

Heckaman was the Democratic-NPL nominee for lieutenant governor in 2016, running with Marvin Nelson. They lost the general election to Doug Burgum and Brent Sanford.

External links
Senator Joan Heckaman official Legislative Assembly biography
Project Vote Smart - Senator Joan Heckaman (ND) profile
Follow the Money - Joan Heckaman
2006 2004 campaign contributions
North Dakota Democratic-NPL Party - Senator Joan Heckaman profile

|-

1946 births
21st-century American politicians
21st-century American women politicians
Candidates in the 2016 United States elections
Democratic Party North Dakota state senators
Living people
Minot State University alumni
Valley City State University alumni
Women state legislators in North Dakota